Oosterbroek is a mansion and a former hamlet in the Dutch province of Drenthe. The mansion is located about 2 km east of Eelde, in the municipality of Tynaarlo.

The hamlet was located around the mansion. The mansion was a havezate which was a requirement to be admitted to the Knights of Drenthe. Around 1850, it had 3 houses and about 25 inhabitants. It was still considered to be a separate settlement in 1997, but the name no longer appears on the newest topographical maps. As of 2021, it is a statistical entity with Groningen Airport Eelde, however the postal authorities have put it under Eelde.

Gallery

References

Buildings and structures in Drenthe
Populated places in Drenthe
Tynaarlo